Bilyana Island is an ice-free island in the Aitcho group on the west side of English Strait in the South Shetland Islands, Antarctica.  Extending , surface area .  The area was visited by early 19th century sealers.

The island's name derives from Bilyana, a name from Bulgarian music folklore.

Location

See also
 Aitcho Islands
 Composite Antarctic Gazetteer
 List of Antarctic islands south of 60° S
 SCAR
 South Shetland Islands
 Territorial claims in Antarctica

References

 Bilyana Island. SCAR Composite Antarctic Gazetteer
 Bulgarian Antarctic Gazetteer. Antarctic Place-names Commission. (details in Bulgarian, basic data in English)

External links
 Bilyana Island. Copernix satellite image

Islands of the South Shetland Islands
Bulgaria and the Antarctic